The modes of transport in Iceland are governed by the country's rugged terrain and sparse population. The principal mode of personal transport is the car. There are no public railways, although there are bus services. Transport from one major town to another, for example Reykjavík to Akureyri, may be by aeroplane on a domestic flight. The only ways of getting in and out of the country are by air and sea. Most of the country's transport infrastructure is concentrated near the Capital Region, which is home to two-thirds of the country's population.

Rail

Iceland has no public railways, although proposals to build a passenger line between Keflavík and Reykjavík have been made as well as proposals to build a light rail system in Reykjavík.

In the past, locomotive-powered and hand-operated rails have been temporarily set up during certain construction projects, and have long since been dismantled. Some artifacts from their existence remains in museums and as static exhibits.

Road

Iceland has  of publicly administered roads,  of which are paved. Organized road building began about 1900 and has greatly expanded since 1980. Vegagerðin (Icelandic Roads Administration) is the legal owner and constructor of the roads, and oversees and maintains them as well. 11.4% of passenger-kilometres are by bus and 88.6% by car.

Sea
The major harbours in Iceland are:

 Akureyri
 Hornafjördur
 Ísafjörður
 Keflavík
 Raufarhöfn
 Reykjavík
 Seyðisfjörður
 Straumsvík
 Vestmannaeyjar
Merchant marine:
total:
3 ships (with a tonnage of 1,000gt or over) totaling 13,085gt/
ships by type:
chemical tanker 1, container ship 1, petroleum tanker 1 (1999 est.)

Transport ferries:
The only habitable islands around Iceland are supplied and infrastructurally connected with the mainland via ferries which run regularly. Those islands are:
 Vestmannaeyjar The largest and most populated island.
 Hrísey In the middle of Eyjafjörður in northern Iceland.
 Grímsey An island in the far-north, the northernmost part of Iceland.

Those ferries are considered part of the infrastructure system such as roads, and are therefore run by Vegagerðin like the roads.

Air

As of 2010, there are 99 airports in Iceland:

Public transport

Public transport systems in Iceland are relatively underdeveloped and many areas are poorly served by public transport.

Limited services are provided in major urban areas, for example Strætó bs operates bus services in Reykjavík, and Strætisvagnar Akureyrar in the northern town of Akureyri. There are nationwide coach and bus services linking the major towns, although many Icelanders use domestic flights to get from one major town to another.

Automobile ownership is also relatively high—the country has one of the highest rates in the world—with 580 cars per 1000 people (as of 2000), a figure similar to the United States. Unusually, this does not cause as much traffic congestion as one might imagine, as the urban area of Reykjavík is relatively spread out in comparison to its population. Therefore demand for public transport services is low and has not developed as much as it has in countries with similar levels of economic development.

In recent years, however, there have been proposals to construct a railway service between Keflavík Airport and Reykjavík. The airport in Keflavík is Iceland’s main international airport, however it is not situated close to the capital. It is currently served by a coach service, but Reykjavik City Council has agreed to conduct a feasibility study on the railway proposal, saying they are prepared to contribute 10 million krónur of funding. A light rail network within the capital has also been proposed.

The country is served by some sea services. For example, ferries are available from the Faroe Islands and Denmark notable operators include Smyril Line amongst others. Ferry services also operate between Þorlákshöfn and the Westman Islands, operated by Eimskip.

See also
H-dagurinn
Rail transport in Iceland
Road signs in Iceland
Tunnels in Iceland
Vegagerðin

References